Pascal Hervé (born 13 July 1964) is a former French road racing cyclist. He competed in the individual road race at the 1992 Summer Olympics and raced as a professional from 1994 to 2001. Pascal now lives in Montreal, were he is co-owner of a training center that helps develop local athletes and amateurs of all ages. In between seasons, he holds cycling trips in various locations such as the Pyrénées, the Vosges, the Alpes and, most recently, the region of Charlevoix.

Doping
Hervé was expelled from the 1998 Tour de France in the Festina affair.

Hervé tested positive for EPO after the prologue in 2001 Giro d'Italia.

Major results

1992
 1st Boucles de la Mayenne
 2nd Overall Circuito Montañés
1993
 2nd Overall Tour de l'Ain
 2nd Overall Tour du Vaucluse
1994
 5th Overall Critérium du Dauphiné Libéré
1st  Mountains classification
1st Stage 5 
 5th GP Ouest–France
 5th A Travers le Morbihan
 6th Road race, National Road Championships
 6th Overall Route du Sud
1995
 1st  Mountains classification Volta a Catalunya
 4th Japan Cup
 6th Milano–Torino
 7th Paris–Camembert
1996
 Giro d'Italia
1st Stage 6 
Held  after Stage 6 
 1st  Mountains classification Volta a la Comunitat Valenciana
 2nd Overall Tour of the Basque Country
 2nd Overall Tour DuPont
1st Stage 8
 2nd Japan Cup
 6th Giro del Piemonte
1997
 3rd Overall Vuelta Ciclista de Chile
1st Stage 2
 3rd Paris–Camembert
 5th Overall Critérium International
 5th Route Adélie
 6th Rund um den Henninger-Turm
 10th Overall Tour of the Basque Country
1998
 1st GP Ouest–France
 1st Trophée des Grimpeurs
 1st Stage 3 Tour of the Basque Country
 6th Road race, National Road Championships
 6th Cholet-Pays de la Loire
 7th La Flèche Wallonne
 10th Overall Critérium International
 10th Overall Route du Sud
1999
 2nd Road race, National Road Championships
 3rd Prueba Villafranca de Ordizia
2000
 1st Polynormande
 1st Stage 4 Tour de Suisse
 3rd Overall Vuelta a Burgos
1st  Points classification
2001
 2nd Giro di Toscana
 6th Overall Tour de Langkawi
 9th Giro dell'Appennino

See also
 List of doping cases in cycling
List of sportspeople sanctioned for doping offences

References

External links

1964 births
Living people
French male cyclists
French Giro d'Italia stage winners
Doping cases in cycling
Sportspeople from Tours, France
Tour de Suisse stage winners
Olympic cyclists of France
Cyclists at the 1992 Summer Olympics
Cyclists from Centre-Val de Loire